The Wagner Seahawks baseball team is a varsity intercollegiate athletic team of Wagner College in Staten Island, New York, United States. The team has been a member of the Northeast Conference, which is part of the National Collegiate Athletic Association's Division I, since 1987. Wagner College's first baseball team was first fielded in 1945. The Seahawks are coached by Craig Noto. The Seahawks have won one Northeast Conference baseball tournament and one Northeast Conference regular season championship, in 2000 and 2009 respectively. Wagner has appeared in the NCAA Division I Baseball Championship once, in 2000.

History
From 2008 to 2020, the team played its home games at Richmond County Bank Ballpark in Staten Island, New York. However, when the Staten Island Yankees folded in 2020, the ballpark temporarily closed and left the Seahawks without a home stadium. The Seahawks played part of the 2020 season (which was later suspended in March due to the COVID-19 pandemic) as a road team. In 2021, they played a majority of their home games at FirstEnergy Park in Lakewood, New Jersey. In 2022, they will play eight home games at the Trenton Thunder Ballpark in Trenton, New Jersey, and another 12 home games at ShoreTown Ballpark (previously known as FirstEnergy Park).

See also
 List of NCAA Division I baseball programs

References

External links
 

Baseball teams established in 1945